John Maunsell Richardson JP DL (Great Limber, Caistor, Lincolnshire 12 June 1846 – Westminster, London, 22 January 1912), known to his friends as the "Cat", was a cricketer who played First-class cricket for Cambridge University, Member of Parliament and a steeplechase jockey who won two Grand Nationals as a rider in the 1870s.

Richardson was educated at Harrow and Magdalene College, Cambridge.

Cricket
Maunsell Richardson played alongside future England Cricket and Rugby Union captain A.N. Hornby for Harrow in both the 1864 and 1865 Eton v Harrow cricket matches, contributing 29 and 24 in innings victories over Eton.

Richardson made his first-class debut for Gentlemen of England against Oxford University in 1866, playing in the same team as another future England captain in a 17-year-old W.G. Grace.

Richardson played for Cambridge University in 3 successive University Matches against Oxford University from 1866 to 1868.  In 1866, Richardson contributed 8 and 6 in a 12 run defeat, 3 and 8 in a 5 wicket victory in 1867 and 3 and 14 in a 168 run victory in 1868.

Richardson's last first-class cricket match was for the Marylebone Cricket Club (MCC) v Nottinghamshire in 1874. MCC beat a strong Nottinghamshire side that included future England captain Alfred Shaw by 6 wickets.

Grand Nationals
Richardson was one of the great gentleman riders of his day having 56 winners in 1872, in addition he trained race horses at his Limber Magna stables.  He won the 1873 and 1874 Grand Nationals riding horses he had trained being Disturbance and Reugny.  Both were owned by James Octavius Machell with whom he fell out when Machell tried to manipulated the betting for the 1874 race. Richardson was so offended at the proposal made to him and disgusted with the sordid nature of the whole business that he made up his mind that, win or lose, his race on Reugny should be his last.

Member of Parliament
Richardson won the 1894 by-election for Brigg, but lost that seat in the General election in the following year.

Family

In 1881, Richardson married Victoria Alexandrina (née Hare), the Countess of Yarborough and widow of his friend Charles Anderson-Pelham, 3rd Earl of Yarborough, who had died six years earlier. His wife, though legally Victoria Richardson, continued to be known as Victoria, Countess of Yarborough.

They had one son, John Richardson.

References

External links 
Wisden Obituary

1846 births
1912 deaths
People educated at Harrow School
Alumni of Magdalene College, Cambridge
English cricketers of 1864 to 1889
Marylebone Cricket Club cricketers
Cambridge University cricketers
People from West Lindsey District
British sportsperson-politicians
Conservative Party (UK) MPs for English constituencies
UK MPs 1892–1895
English jockeys
Deputy Lieutenants of Lincolnshire
British racehorse trainers
English cricketers
Gentlemen of England cricketers